Hirdepur is a small village in Bihiya block of Bhojpur district in Bihar, India. As of 2011, its population was 294, in 39 households. It is located west of the town of Bihiya.

References 

Villages in Bhojpur district, India